A General, a Scholar and a Eunuch (Traditional Chinese: 超時空男臣; literally "Time-Travelling Male Official") is a 2017 Hong Kong television costume historical, science fiction comedy drama produced by Marco Law for TVB, starring Edwin Siu, Kristal Tin, Raymond Cho, Grace Wong and Matthew Ho as the main cast. It premiered on Hong Kong's TVB Jade and Malaysia's Astro On Demand on July 17, 2017 airing Monday through Friday during its 8:30 to 9:30 pm timeslot and concluding August 27, 2017 with a total of 32 episodes.

A General, a Scholar and a Eunuch is a historical fiction comedy about three Ming dynasty imperial officials who accidentally travel to modern day Mainland China by accident while searching for the crown prince's missing wife. The three male leads are actual historical Chinese figures Yuan Chonghuan, Zuo Guangdou and Wei Zhongxian, however, the characters are portrayed fictitiously in the drama.

Synopsis
General Yuan Chonghuan (Edwin Siu), Donglin Academy scholar Zuo Guangdou (Raymond Cho), and eunuch Li Junchong (Matthew Ho) are Ming Dynasty imperial officials that accidentally went through a time portal while escaping assassins during their mission of escorting the betrothal Crown Princess (Grace Wong). The three find themselves in modern-day Foshan China at an ancient filming set which confuses them from reality and fiction. They also meet film production manager Sister Ha whom they mistake as a lazy court maid. Sister Ha befriends the three when they are unable to pay a restaurant bill, after she finds out the jade pendant Guangdou gave her as a token of appreciation is in fact a priceless Ming dynasty relic. Sister Ha modernizes the appearance of the three in an impoverish style and gives them work as film extras. She also gives them three new names. Chonghuan becomes Wan Tai-kwan, Guangdou becomes Fung Yat-bo and Junchong becomes Lee Siu-tung. When Junchong encounters popular female actress Sandy Wang Yi-san (Grace Wong) at the filming studio, he mistakes her as the Crown Princess. However, Sandy who is really a hypocritical fake person that pretends to care about her fans but think they are really idiots, thinks the three are her fans. Sandy's manager prevents the three from communicating with her unless they join her fan club which cost HK$3000 each person. The three borrow the fan club entry fee from sister Ha, but in order to pay her back Chonghuan has to work as a cross-dressing stunt double.

Meanwhile struggling restaurant owner Jackie Fung Wai-chi (Kristal Tin) from Hong Kong is also in Foshan to search for a new head chef at her restaurant since the current head chef suffers from Alzheimer and can't remember how to cook a single dish. When she is unable to find her intended prospect she holds a cooking competition at a hotel banquet hall. Wanting to help pay off their debt, Junchong decides to join the cooking competition, but his confusion and as well as the faulty system of the elevator causes him to be late. When he arrives at the competition site Jackie had left. Still determined to get hired he cooks a dish, but Jackie's uncle shoos him away. When Jackie returns to the competition site she recognizes Junchong dish as the signature dish of her restaurant, but Junchong is nowhere to be found by then. Determined to find Junchong she posts fliers all over the city looking for him. After a passerby tells Jackie that he knows who the person on the flier is, she arrives at the film studio just in time to say that she will bring them to and take care of them in Hong Kong when the three beg Sister Ha that they must go to Hong Kong after seeing a celebrity news report that Sandy is leaving Foshan and returning to Hong Kong.

Junchong, not wanting to sign a long-term work contract with Jackie refuses her offer of employment no matter how high a price she offers. In order to trick the three and especially Junchong, she lies that she and Sandy are close friends and that she will help them get in contact with her. When Jackie's father meets the three he does not believe that Junchong/Siu-tung is the newly hired head chef due to his young age. Siu-tung proves everyone wrong when his cooking impresses a very important guest their rival had brought to the restaurant. Soon Siu-tung becomes a media darling when television stations line up to have him as a guest and also a social media celebrity with a huge following.

Unhappy with their newfound success, Jackie's rival tries to lure Siu-tung to work for them with every means possible. Meanwhile Tai-kwan has attracted the attention of a triad boss who causes trouble for the restaurant. Impressed by Tai-kwan's highly skilled martial arts, the triad boss tries to force Tai-kwan into joining his gang. Yat-bo, who has been absorbing all of modern technology and information creates a believable lie that scares off the triad gang. When Sandy uses Yat-bo to ward off an unwanted suitor, he finds himself falling for her since he had a romantic relationship with the Crown Princess during their actual timeline.

All seems fine when Jackie merges to become part of their rival company, but the true evil culprit who wants to ruin them and expose their secret of being sent from the past starts to emerge. With problems dealing with their current enemy the three also faces more problems when a powerful enemy from the Ming Dynasty, who Tai-kwan is no match for also comes to the future to look for them and bring their heads back to the Ming Dynasty.

Ending
A General, a Scholar and a Eunuch ending was left inconclusive leading to speculation of a possible sequel.

Cast

Ming dynasty
Edwin Siu as Yuan Chonghuan (袁崇煥 later named Wan Tai-kwan 雲大軍)
A highly skilled martial arts fighter, high ranking general from the Ming Dynasty. He was tasked with leading the army on escorting the betrothal Crown Princess. He and Jackie had an unpleasant first encounter since he thought kissing people on the mouth resolves all disputes and arguments from what he had seen in an online drama clip. The two later fall in love after going through many hardships together.
Grace Wong as Sandy Wang Yi-san / Kwok Sin (汪以珊 / 郭倩)
The girl chosen to be married to the Crown Prince. In the present she is a popular actress who is two-faced and insensitive. Her ruthless gold-digging ways and unreasonable requests cause her to lose her work contracts and company management. It is later revealed that Sandy is the actual Princess who had arrived at the present before the three.
Raymond Cho as Zuo Guangdou (左光斗 later named Fung Yat-bo 馮一波)
A Ming Dynasty scholar who is considered a genius due to his amazing memory and mathematical skills. After time-travelling, he is the first of the three to learn and be able to understand modern technology. During the Ming Dynasty he had a romantic relationship with the Crown Princess (before she was chosen) whom he was forbidden to love due to their social standing, in the present time he finds himself falling in love with Sandy after she uses him to ward off an unwanted suitor.
Matthew Ho as Li Junchong (李進忠 later named Lee Siu-tung 李小冬)
A eunuch from the Ming Dynasty. He is the youngest and most innocent of the three, and a highly skilled cook in palace cuisine. It's because of his skills that Jackie desperately lures the three to Hong Kong to work for her. His appearance and young age leaves others in disbelief that he is a highly skilled chef. His kindness leads Cat to make him her boyfriend.
Timothy Cheng as Cheung Sing  (張誠)
Leader of the Eastern Gate eunuchs.  Members of his eunuch household were executed when the Crown Prince had a nightmare involving the eunuchs with the last name Ngai (魏). Has a high influence over the emperor and Crown Prince while Yuan Chonghuan, Zuo Gunagdou time travelled to the future.

Fung & Wan family
David Chiang as Fong Tin (方天)
Jackie, Cat and Kei's widowed father. Yuk-fun's older brother. He is always bickering with his brother-in-law Wai-tai, as the two argue over who is the boss of the restaurant. He believes he is since his father in-law who founded the restaurant left it to his wife and then his deceased wife left it to Jackie. He is also bitter over Chu Kwok-fung's success and fortune.
Kristal Tin as Jackie Fong Wai-chi (方惠芝)
Fong Tin's oldest daughter. Cat and Kei's older sister. Wai-tai, Yi-hung and Yuk-fun's niece. She is the head of the family restaurant since her later mother left it to her. In order to prevent her family's bickering she often covers for family members wrongdoing. Due to the current state of the head chef, she heads to Foshan to find a new chef in order to save the family restaurant. After tasting Siu-tung's cooking she uses desperate measures to lure the three to Hong Kong to work for her.
Rebecca Zhu as Catherine (Cat) Fong Wai-ling (方惠玲)
Fong Tin's second daughter. Becomes involved with Siu-tung not knowing he is a eunuch.
Vicky Chan as Fong Wai-kei (方惠琪)
Fong Tin's youngest daughter.
Willie Wai as Wan Wai-tai (溫偉泰)
Brother-in-law of the Fongs.  Uses his position in the family restaurant for personal gains but is given a second chance by Jackie to keep the family together.
Rachel Kan as Yue Yi-hung (余綺虹)
Sister-in-law of the Fongs. Wan Wai-tai's wife.
LuLu Kai as Fong Yuk-fun (方玉芬)
Fong Tin's younger sister.
Burmie Wong as Wan Suet-lin (溫雪蓮)

Chu family
Joseph Lee as Chu Kwok-fung (朱國豐)
Claire Yiu as Gillian Chu-Kwok Fung-kiu (朱郭鳳嬌)
Tsui Wing as Samuel Cheuk Wah (卓華)
James Ng as Ivan Chu Ka-hin (朱家軒)
Gloria Tang as Chu Ka-yiu (朱家瑤)
Yiub Cheng as Chu Ka-bou (朱家寶)

Extended cast
Harriet Yeung as Sister Ha (霞姐)
Ram Chiang as security guard captain
Dickson Lee as Terry Lam Tak-lei (林得利)
Doris Chow as Ceci Yu Sin-ci
Sin Ho-ying as Ding Hau (丁孝)
Tammy Ou-Yang as Baby Tse Sum-yi
Brian Burrell as a missionary during the Ming dynasty
Jan Tse as a concubine during the Ming dynasty
Jessica Kan as Wong Yi-San (汪以珊)

Development and production
The costume fitting ceremony was held on October 4, 2016 12:30 pm at Tseung Kwan O TVB City Studio One Common Room.
The blessing ceremony was held on October 31, 2015 3:00 pm at Tseung Kwan O TVB City Studio.
Filming took place from October 2016 till February 2017, on location in Hong Kong and Foshan China.
Rosina Lam was originally cast as the Princess character, but turned it down due to her busy personal schedule. Grace Wong was then cast in the part.

Viewership Ratings

Awards and nominations

References

External links
A General, a Scholar and a Eunuch Official TVB website 

TVB dramas
Hong Kong television series
2017 Hong Kong television series debuts
2017 Hong Kong television series endings
2010s Hong Kong television series
Hong Kong time travel television series